Dmytro Milyutenko (21 February 1899 – 25 January 1966) was a Ukrainian stage and film actor of the Soviet era.

Partial filmography

 Bolshaya igra (1934)
 Tom Soyer (1936)
 Karmeliuk (1938) - Yarjoma - Kovalya's son
 Shchors (1939) - Weaver / Vladimir Vinichenko
 Vsadniki (1939) - Guest at the reception (uncredited)
 Kubantsy (1940) - Grandfather Makar Ocheretov
 Bogdan Khmelnitskiy (1941) - Hetman Mykola Pototzky
 Partizany v stepyakh Ukrainy (1943) - Filimon Dovgonosik
 Zigmund Kolosovskiy (1946) - Deputy Ventsel
 Secret Agent (1947) - Berezhnoy
 Taras Shevchenko (1951) - Commander Irakty Aleksandrovich Uskov
 V stepakh Ukrajiny (1952)
 Martin Borulya (1953) - Protasiy Penenozhka
 Kalinovaya roshcha (1954)
 Bogatyr idyot v Marto (1954) - 'Khozyain'
 Mat (1956)
 Ivan Franko (1956) - Governor-general of Galicia
 Pavel Korchagin (1957) - Tokarev
 Sto tysjach (1958) - Gerasim Nikodimovich Kalitka
 Green Van (1959)
 Zelyonyy furgon (1960) - grandfather Taras
 Ivan's Childhood (1962) - Old Man
 V myortvoy petle (1963) - Dirin
 Sorok minut do rassveta (1963) - Demid Antonovich
 Nash chestnyy khleb (1964) - Makar Zadorozhnyy
 The Dream (1964) - Dyadko Ivan
 Eskadra ukhodit na zapad (1965) - Colonel Ferambe
 Net neizvestnykh soldat (1965) - Bimba
 Krynytsya dlya sprahlykh (1965) - Serdyuk
 Vnimaniyu grazhdan i organizatsiy (1966) - (final film role)

References

Bibliography 
 Neia Markovna Zorkaia. The illustrated history of the Soviet cinema. Hippocrene Books, 1989.

External links 
 

1899 births
1966 deaths
Burials at Baikove Cemetery
People from Sloviansk
Ukrainian male stage actors
Ukrainian male film actors